Mohammad Hazratpour (Persian: محمد حضرت‌ پور, born 1982 in Urmia, West Azerbaijan Province, Iran) is an Iranian politician and the forty-first mayor of Urmia. He is elected by the city council of Urmia since June 2012.

Hazratpour has external relations with the mayors of Erzurum, Turkey and consul general of Turkey in Urmia. He also expanded Shahrdari Urmia F.C. and Shahrdari Urmia VC. His nephew, Rohollah Hazratpour is the member of parliament from Urmia.

Notes

References

Sources
 عملکرد شهردار اورمیه ازنگاه یک شهروند با عینک طبی

Living people
People from Urmia
1982 births
Mayors of places in Iran